The 1970 French Grand Prix was a Formula One motor race held at the Circuit de Charade, Clermont-Ferrand on 5 July 1970. It was race 6 of 13 in both the 1970 World Championship of Drivers and the 1970 International Cup for Formula One Manufacturers. This was the third French Grand Prix to be held at the Circuit de Charade and the second in succession, after plans to hold the race at the Circuit d'Albi near Toulouse fell through.

The 38-lap race was won by Lotus driver Jochen Rindt after he started from sixth position. Chris Amon finished second for the March team and Brabham driver Jack Brabham came in third.

Qualifying

Qualifying classification

Race

Classification

Notes
 This was the last F1 race to be held on public roads with no Armco lined around the circuit. When F1 returned to the Charade circuit in 1972, Armco had already been installed there.
 Last Points: Dan Gurney

Championship standings after the race

Drivers' Championship standings

Constructors' Championship standings

References

French Grand Prix
French Grand Prix
1970 in French motorsport